The Men's 10 metre platform competition of the diving events at the 2016 FINA Diving World Cup took place between 23 and 24 February.

Results

The preliminary round was held on 23 February at 10:00. The semifinal was held on 24 February at 10:00. The final was held on 24 February at 13:15.

Green denotes finalists

Blue denotes semifinalists

References

FINA Diving World Cup